BRL-54443 is a drug which acts as a selective agonist for the 5-HT1E and 5-HT1F serotonin receptor subtypes.

References

5-HT1E agonists
5-HT1F agonists
Indoles
Piperidines
Phenols